Carex pringlei is a tussock-forming species of perennial sedge in the family Cyperaceae. It is native to north eastern parts of Mexico.

The species was first formally described by the botanist Liberty Hyde Bailey in 1892 as a part of the Botanical Gazette. The type specimen was collected by Cyrus Pringle in 1891 near San Luis Potosí.

See also
List of Carex species

References

pringlei
Taxa named by Liberty Hyde Bailey
Plants described in 1892
Flora of Mexico